Angela Kyerematen-Jimoh is a Ghanaian business leader and Microsoft’s Strategic Partnership Lead for Africa. Prior to joining Microsoft, she was the Executive Director/Regional Head for IBM North, East and West Africa from 2020 to 2021. She is the former Country General Manager for Ghana. She is the first female to become country director of IBM in Africa and the first African and female to be appointed Regional General Manager.

Education 
Angela holds a BA in Marketing and French. She is an alumna of Harvard Business School and London Guildhall College. She is also an old student of Wesley Girls' High School and Achimota School in Ghana.

Career 
She has 20 years extensive working experience in the financial services and technology industries in Africa and Europe. In 2011 she joined IBM as the Territory Marketing Manager responsible for IBM West Africa. She later moved to Nairobi, Kenya as Strategy Leader for IBM's Central, East and West Africa operations. Ms Angela Kyerematen-Jimoh serves as a member of the governing board of bank of Ghana chaired by Dr. Ernest Addison of which the board will be responsible for the formulation of policies for the achievement of the central banks’ objectives.

Before joining IBM, she worked in the UK for UBS Investment Bank and ABN AMRO Bank.

In January 2022, Microsoft announced the appointment of Angela Kyerematen-Jimoh, international corporate law expert, as the new Africa Strategic Partnerships Manager in its new Africa Transformation Office (ATO). The office will focus on facilitating growth and investment in four key development areas: digital infrastructure, skills development, small and medium enterprises (SMEs) and startups.

She also serves on the board of the Bank of Ghana.

Awards 
WomanRising ranked her among the Top 50 Corporate Women Leaders in Ghana for 2016. In 2018, she was awarded the Corporate Personality of the Year by Glitz Africa. In 2023, she was named by Forbes Afrique among the Top 50 Women Managers in Africa.

References

External links
 Anis Haffar, "The first lady of IBM Africa", Education Matters, 2020-08-17.

Ghanaian businesspeople
Living people
Harvard Business School alumni
Year of birth missing (living people)